The Tūtoko River is a river located in the Darran Mountains in New Zealand. Originating from the western flank of Mount Tūtoko it is a tributary of the Cleddau River.

See also
List of rivers of New Zealand

References

Rivers of Fiordland